Utah State Route 191 may refer to:

 U.S. Route 191 in Utah, the state highway designation (legislative overlay) for the three non-concurrent sections of U.S. Route 191 (excluding its concurrencies with Interstate 70, U.S. Route 6, and U.S. Route 40) within Utah, United States, that runs from Arizona to Wyoming (through San Juan, Grand, Emery, Carbon, Duchesne, Uintah, and Daggett counties)
 By  Utah State law, U.S. Route 191 within the state (except its concurrencies) has been defined as "State Route 191" since the establishment of its current routing in 1981
 Utah State Route 191 (1945-1953), a former state highway in northeastern Utah County, Utah, that connected Utah State Route 73 (at a junction south of Cedar Fort) with Fairfield (the route became part of current routing of Utah State Route 73 in 1953)

See also

 List of state highways in Utah
 List of U.S. Highways in Utah
 List of named highway junctions in Utah
 List of highways numbered 191

External links

 Utah Department of Transportation Highway Resolutions: Route 191 (PDF)